"Often" is a song by Canadian singer the Weeknd. It was released on July 31, 2014, as the lead single from his second studio album, Beauty Behind the Madness (2015). The song contains a sample from "Ben Sana Vurgunum" by Turkish singer Nükhet Duru.

"Often" peaked within the top 60 on the Billboard Hot 100 and the top 70 of the Canadian Hot 100. The song won two awards at the 2015 Much Music Video Awards, Video of the Year and Best Director.

Critical reception
Justin Davis of Complex said that the Weeknd was "less dour and a little more excited on this song in comparison with most of the releases from his debut studio album, Kiss Land (2013), and "Often" turns him back to his more lyrical days with a stronger delivery." April Clare Welsh of NME stated the Weeknd "sounds like R Kelly on Viagra, spoiling a track that’s seductive enough on its own with lines like 'Baby I can make that pussy rain often.'"

Commercial performance
In the United States, "Often" debuted at number 97 on the US Billboard Hot 100 chart on the week of November 1, 2014. On the week of February 7, 2015, the song peaked at number 59. The song spent a total of 20 weeks on the chart. On December 7, 2016, the single was certified triple platinum by the Recording Industry Association of America (RIAA) for combined sales and streaming equivalent units of over three million units in the United States.

In Canada, the song debuted at number 95 on the Canadian Hot 100 chart on the week of November 1, 2014. On the week of February 28, 2015, it peaked at number 69 on the chart. The song spent a total of 20 weeks on the chart. The single was certified gold by Music Canada for sales of over 40,000 copies in Canada.

Music video
A music video for "Often" was released on August 21, 2014. It depicts the Weeknd in a hotel room, accompanied by several women in various implicit states of undress.

Remixes
The official remix features additional verses from Rick Ross and Schoolboy Q. Another remix, by Norwegian record producer and DJ Kygo was also released.

Charts

Weekly charts

Year-end charts

Certifications

Release history

References

2014 songs
2014 singles
The Weeknd songs
Song recordings produced by the Weeknd
Songs written by Belly (rapper)
Songs written by DaHeala
Songs written by the Weeknd
Republic Records singles
XO (record label) singles